The Governor of Volyn Oblast is the head of executive branch for the Volyn Oblast.

The office of Governor is an appointed position, with officeholders being appointed by the President of Ukraine, on recommendation from the Prime Minister of Ukraine, to serve a four-year term.

The official residence for the Governor is located in Lutsk. Since 2 December 2019 the Governor is Yuriy Pohulyaiko.

Governors
 Volodymyr Blazhenchuk (1992–1994, as the Presidential representative)
 Yuriy Lenartovych (1994, acting until 1994 as the Presidential representative)
 Borys Klimchuk (1995–2002, as the Governor)
 Anatoliy Frantsuz (2002–2005)
 Volodymyr Bondar (2005–2007)
 Mykola Romanyuk (2007–2010, acting to 2007)
 Borys Klimchuk (2010–2014)
 Oleksandr Bashkalenko (2014)
 Hryhoriy Pustovit (2014) 
 Volodymyr Hunchyk (2014–2018)
 Oleksandr Savchenko (2018–2019)
 Yuriy Pohulyaiko (2019–present)
Since 11 June 2019 acting Governor  is Oleksandr Kyrychuk.

Notes

References

Sources
 World Statesmen.org

External links
Government of Volyn Oblast in Ukrainian (cached copy)

 
Volyn Oblast